In enzymology, a precorrin-6Y C5,15-methyltransferase (decarboxylating) is an enzyme that catalyzes the chemical reaction

2 S-adenosyl-L-methionine + precorrin-6Y  2 S-adenosyl-L-homocysteine + precorrin-8X + CO2

The two substrates of this enzyme are S-adenosyl methionine and precorrin 6Y; its three products are S-adenosylhomocysteine, precorrin 8X, and CO2.

This enzyme belongs to the family of transferases, specifically those transferring one-carbon group methyltransferases.  The systematic name of this enzyme class is S-adenosyl-L-methionine:1-precorrin-6Y C5,15-methyltransferase (C-12-decarboxylating). Other names in common use include precorrin-6 methyltransferase, precorrin-6Y methylase and CobL. This enzyme is part of the biosynthetic pathway to cobalamin (vitamin B12) in aerobic bacteria.

See also
 Cobalamin biosynthesis

References

 

EC 2.1.1
Enzymes of unknown structure